Gravity Kills was an American industrial rock band from St. Louis, Missouri. Their music was described by one critic as "a blending of eerie industrial rock with a pop-infused melodic chorus and a bit of hard-core head banging." The band was formed in 1994. They had their first hit single with "Guilty", a track later released on their 1996 debut album Gravity Kills. The band released two additional albums of new material, Perversion in 1998 and Superstarved in 2002, as well as a remix album in 1997. Their singles "Falling" (from Perversion) and "One Thing" (from Superstarved) both achieved minor radio success. Due to the lack of tour support from their record label, they were unable to complete a tour for Superstarved and broke up in 2003. From 2005 to 2012, Gravity Kills reunited for occasional one-off festivals and shows.

Gravity Kills' songs have been featured on soundtracks for a variety of media, such as Mortal Kombat, Se7en, Escape From L.A., and Kissing a Fool, in addition to video games such as the Test Drive franchise. They have toured with such bands as Sex Pistols, Sevendust, Local H, Flaw, Sister Machine Gun, and Pigface.

History

Formation, name, and self-titled debut album (1994–1996)  

As the band was forming in 1994, keyboardist Doug Firley was reading an article where he misread what he thought said "like the Gravity Kills." He went back through the article and could not find what he thought he had read. Firley told drummer Kurt Kerns and guitarist Matt Dudenhoeffer about it and thought that Gravity Kills would be a great name for the band. Kerns and Dudenhoeffer really made sense of the name when comparing what they were doing with music (deconstructing samples and noise) to an architect they were both into named Lebbeus Woods and his theories regarding deconstruction and ultimately reconstruction. In response to a contest from St. Louis area radio station KPNT for a compilation CD of local artists, the trio brought in vocalist Jeff Scheel (Kerns' cousin) to record and mix a track in one week during the summer of 1994. The resulting song, "Guilty", was given heavy airplay and quickly became the most requested song at the station. The band continued to write and record songs throughout 1995.

Although nearly an entire year had passed since "Guilty" was first released, Gravity Kills finally played their first live show in November 1995 at a soldout venue in St. Louis. Later that month, the band officially signed a record deal with TVT Records. The band's first self-titled album was released in March 1996, and peaked at No. 89 on the Billboard 200 chart and No. 1 on the Billboard Heatseekers chart. "Guilty", the first single, found heavy airplay upon its release. It peaked at No. 24 on the Billboard Modern Rock chart, No. 39 on the Billboard Mainstream Rock chart, and at No. 86 on the Billboard 100 chart. Videos were made for "Guilty", "Enough", and "Down". "Enough" in particular had peaked at No. 98 on the UK Singles Chart. Hollywood also embraced the band's music as they landed songs on three high profile soundtracks: Se7en, Mortal Kombat, and Escape From L.A.. The band had re-recorded the song "Blame" for the Escape From L.A. soundtrack, and it was released as an individual single.

Gravity Kills toured in the summer of 1996 with the Sex Pistols and embarked on a solo tour that fall. With the success of the first album, the band quickly established itself on the rock scene as one of the most promising young bands in the industrial music scene. Gravity Kills' album was also released worldwide with chart success in England, Germany, and France.

Manipulated, live tours, and Perversion (1997–2000)
In 1997, TVT Records released a remix compilation album called Manipulated which contained remixes from the band's self-titled debut album songs "Guilty", "Blame", "Enough", "Down", and "Here". That year, they contributed a song to the Gary Numan tribute album Random, "Poetry and Power". Gravity Kills also briefly collaborated with the musician Moby on a song titled "Suffocating". It was meant to be included on the soundtrack to the film Spawn; however, Moby disliked the outcome, and instead worked with Butthole Surfers for the soundtrack. The outtake was later released online.

On April 19, 1998, Scheel suffered a whiplash when he got overexcited during a warm-up gig at the University Wellness & Activities in San Antonio, Texas. He had not performed live with the band since a previous live concert at the Q101 Festival in Chicago, IL on October 16, 1997. The injury happened at a club in what was supposed to be a low-key gig that attracted 6,000 fans, according to the band's label, TVT Records. The injury, which put Scheel out of commission for a few weeks, came less than a week before Junkie XL leader Tom Holkenborg injured his back in an onstage accident; ironically, Junkie XL and Gravity Kills were scheduled to join British band Pitchshifter on a U.S. tour on June 3.

The band released their second studio album in June 1998, titled Perversion. The album was less successful than their self-titled debut but still sold well, peaking at No. 107 on the Billboard 200 chart. The single "Falling" peaked at No. 35 on the Billboard Mainstream Rock chart, and was featured in the 1998 racing video game Test Drive 5 along with Pitchshifter, Fear Factory, Junkie XL, and KMFDM. "Alive" and "Drown" also appeared in another game from the same franchise in 1998, Test Drive Off-Road 2. On July 1, 1998 at the Summerfest in Milwaukee, Wisconsin, Scheel got the whole crowd chanting "Fuck you!" while the show was being broadcast live on a mainstream rock local radio station, Lazer 103 FM. This was a familiar phrase to the July 2, 1997 Summerfest. The station's DJ tried to get the crowd to stop, but he was having mic problems and the crowd ignored him. In August 1999, drummer Kerns had left the band, reasons for leaving as a chance for him to spend time with his family and to return to practicing architecture. He was replaced by Brad Booker, former drummer for the band Stir.

Superstarved, Doug Firley's injury, and split-up (2001–2003)
After the release of Perversion, numerous recording sessions commenced for the third album between June 1999 and August 2001. An entire tracklist was completed; however, the band was dissatisfied with the mixes and returned to the studio. Gravity Kills also signed with their new label Sanctuary Records. The initial sessions would later be leaked online (by Scheel himself), which also contained six songs that had not made the final album's cut.

In May 2002, Sanctuary Records released the third and final studio album Superstarved. The UK version of the album was released by Mayan Records (which was a part of Sanctuary Records) and the Japan version of the album was released by Victor Entertainment. The single "One Thing" had charted at No. 24 on the Billboard Mainstream Rock chart, the band's highest position to date. Just after the album's release, on May 3, 2002, keyboardist Firley sustained serious injury to his hand in Allentown, Pennsylvania while performing in front of a sold out crowd. The injury occurred when Firley dropped the 300 pound custom-made spring-loaded steel keyboard on his hand, shattering the bones in his right ring finger during the band's performance of their single "One Thing". The band returned home to St. Louis after finishing the weekend shows in New Jersey and New York for Firley to seek treatment and had to sell off the components of the recording studio it owned, thus ending the cycle of tour dates. Firley later underwent surgery to fix his hand.

On January 4, 2003, the band officially broke up, a statement posted on the site read as follows:

The band members scattered to different occupations. Matt Dudenhoeffer returned to an engineering job outside of the music industry. Doug Firley went on tour with Alicia Keys as a keyboard tech and then worked as a draftsman before forming the production team Shock City Productions with Chris Loesch. Brad Booker became the new drummer for the band Apartment 26, and later reunited with his previous band Stir on multiple occasions. Jeff Scheel went to work at the Box Talent Agency as an agent for corporations, casinos, and clubs. Scheel was also the vocalist of a band called Star 13 (stylized as *13).

Reformation, performances, and abandoned fourth studio album (2005–2012) 
On October 28, 2005, Gravity Kills reunited to perform for a self-created Halloween music festival in St. Louis, Missouri entitled The Killoween Freakshow. It was initially to be an annual event, as another Killoween occurred on October 28, 2006, at Pop's Nightclub and Bar. Due to a scheduling conflict, Killoween was instead The Nightmare Before Thanksgiving on November 21, 2007. Gravity Kills confirmed rumors that had persisted over the past year on October 20, 2009 and the band announced that they were working on new music. The band performed in Tulsa at the Hard Rock Hotel and Casino on May 7, 2010, and at Roberts Orpheum Theater in St. Louis, MO on June 25, 2010 as part of a benefit show.

The band was working on a follow-up album, as they maintained an online diary regarding their progress. They revealed a working title for one of the songs, "Again".

On December 13, 2018, Gravity Kills noted on their official Facebook page that the last time the band had performed together was on November 23, 2012 at The Pageant in St. Louis, Missouri. The band was considered to be in hiatus, but in November 2022 they previewed a vinyl reissue of their self-titled debut album. The post displayed the tentative vinyl packaging and no release date was given.

Band members
Final members
Jeff Scheel — vocals (1994–2003, 2005–2012)
Matt Dudenhoeffer — guitar (1994–2003, 2005–2012)
Doug Firley — bass, keyboard (1994–2003, 2005–2012)
Kurt Kerns — drums, vocals (1994–1999, 2005–2012)

Former members
Brad Booker — drums (2000–2003)

Discography

Studio albums

Remix albums/singles

Charting albums and singles

Albums
1996 Gravity Kills Heatseekers No. 1
1996 Gravity Kills The Billboard 200 No. 89
1998 Perversion The Billboard 200 No. 107
2002 Superstarved CMJ Retail charts No. 62

Singles

Music videos

Other appearances

See also
List of alternative music artists
List of industrial music bands

References

External links
Official Gravity Kills on YouTube
Official Gravity Kills Music  on YouTube
Official Jeff Scheel's Blog on Blogspot
Allmusic entry for Gravity Kills
Gravity Kills at MTV.com

TVT Records artists
1994 establishments in Missouri
Musical groups from St. Louis
Musical groups established in 1994
Musical groups disestablished in 2003
Musical groups reestablished in 2005
Musical groups disestablished in 2012
Alternative rock groups from Missouri
American industrial metal musical groups
American electronic rock musical groups
Musical quartets
Virgin Records artists